Steve Mattsson (born December 16, 1959) is an American comic book writer and colorist.

His career began in the mid-1980s, with contributions to Dark Horse Comics's project Boris the Bear.

He also served as co-creator, co-writer, and writer of DC's Superboy and the Ravers.

References

American comics artists
American comics writers
Living people
1959 births